Pages of Treasures  (Traditional Chinese: Click入黃金屋) is a TVB modern drama series broadcast in December 2008.

Synopsis
Fong Hok-Man (Paul Chun) works in a bookstore and lives by the principles that knowledge is power. He has 3 children, 2 sons - Sum-Ming (Wayne Lai) and Sum-Ching (Eric Suen) and a daughter, Sum-Mei (Lily Ho). Sum Ming is not good in his studies and did not further his education at the tertiary level. However, Sum-Ching is very smart and chose to further his studies in IT at a university in United States. To fund his studies, Sum Ming works hard in Mauritius for better pay.

The two brothers now decide to return to Hong Kong. Coincidentally, they both end up working in the same commercial building, Sum-Ming as a security guard while Sum-Ching works as a Senior network Security Engineer. Hok-Man is afraid that the brothers' different job levels will cause a rift in their relationship.

Sum Ming starts to fall for Yuen Wai-Chung (Sonija Kwok), who owns a clay model shop. Hok-Man tries to help Sum Ming launch a better career by buying a bookstore for him to manage. Sum-Ching, who already has a girlfriend, Abbie Lui Yuen-Yee (Shirley Yeung), starts to fall for his colleague, Chui Hei-Man (Vivien Yeo).

Cast

The Fong family

The Lui family

Other cast

Awards and nominations
TVB Anniversary Awards (2009)
 Best Drama
 Most Improved Actress (Sharon Chan)

Viewership ratings

References

External links
TVB.com Pages of Treasures - Official Website 
TVB Review Blog Pages of Treasures - Episode Summaries and Screen Captures 

TVB dramas
2008 Hong Kong television series debuts
2009 Hong Kong television series endings